The 1970 Valparaiso Crusaders football team represented Valparaiso University as a member of the Indiana Collegiate Conference (ICC) during the 1970 NCAA College Division football season. Led by third-year head coach Norm Amundsen, the Crusaders compiled and overall record of 5–3–1 with a conference mark of 1–4, placing fourth in the ICC.

Schedule

Roster

References

Valparaiso
Valparaiso Beacons football seasons
Valparaiso Crusaders football